Ellegarden is the first EP album by the Japanese music group Ellegarden.  It was released on May 23, 2001.

Track listing
 The End of the World - 4:01
 Stupid - 3:46
 Hana (花, Flower) - 4:30
 Punk - 2:34
 Knife (ナイフ) - 3:31

Charts

References

Ellegarden albums
2001 EPs